The 1972–73 Quebec Nordiques season was the Nordiques' first season, as they were one of the original teams in the newly created WHA.  The Nordiques franchise was originally awarded to a group in San Francisco, California, and was named the San Francisco Sharks, however, funding collapsed prior to the start of the season, and the WHA sold the organization to a Quebec City group led by Marcel Aubut and Paul Racine.  They named the club the Nordiques due to the northern location of the team.

Regular season
The Nordiques would name former Montreal Canadiens great Maurice Richard the head coach of the club, and played their first ever game on October 11, 1972, losing 2–0 on the road to the Cleveland Crusaders. The Nordiques would win their home opener, shutting out the Alberta Oilers 6–0 at Le Colisée. After the game, Richard would step down from head coaching duties, as he was not comfortable doing the job, and Maurice Filion would take over. The Nords would end up just missing the playoffs, finishing the year with a 33–40–5 record, earning them 71 points, 3 behind the Ottawa Nationals for the final playoff position in the Eastern Division.

Offensively, Quebec was led by defenceman J. C. Tremblay, who led the WHA in assists with 75 and led the Nordiques with 89 points.  Alain Caron would score a team high 36 goals.  Michel Parizeau and Andre Gaudette would each break the 70 point barrier, recording 73 points and 71 respectively.  Pierre Roy would lead the club with 169 penalty minutes, while Michel Rouleau would get 142 in 52 games after being acquired by the Philadelphia Blazers.

In goal, Serge Aubry would get the majority of playing time, earning a club high 25 wins and a team best 3.60 GAA along with 2 shutouts.

Season standings

Schedule and results

Player statistics

Awards and records

Transactions

See also
 1972–73 WHA season

References

SHRP Sports
The Internet Hockey Database

Quebec Nordiques seasons
Que
Quebec